Thomas Seeliger (born 20 September 1966) is a German former footballer and current manager. He spent four seasons in the Bundesliga with Fortuna Düsseldorf, SC Freiburg, and TSV 1860 Munich.

Since retiring as a player, Seeliger has been a manager at the semi-pro and amateur level in the Hamburg area, and also runs a football school.

References

External links
 
 
 Thomas Seeliger Interview

1966 births
Living people
People from Medebach
Sportspeople from Arnsberg (region)
German footballers
Footballers from North Rhine-Westphalia
Association football midfielders
Bundesliga players
2. Bundesliga players
Fortuna Düsseldorf players
Eintracht Braunschweig players
Ligue 1 players
AS Nancy Lorraine players
SC Freiburg players
TSV 1860 Munich players
VfL Wolfsburg players
FC St. Pauli players
FC Eintracht Norderstedt 03 players
SC Victoria Hamburg players
Lüneburger SK players
German football managers
Altonaer FC von 1893 managers
German expatriate footballers
German expatriate sportspeople in France
Expatriate footballers in France
West German footballers